is a Japanese animation studio founded in July 1979 by Hiroyoshi Mitsunobu and his wife Sachiko. In 1985 Hiroyoshi Mitsunobu fell ill and Sachiko Mitsunobu was appointed president. During that time Seiji Mitsunobu (Hiroyoshi and Sachiko's son) was appointed CEO.

Subsidiaries
LARX Entertainment Co., Ltd. (株式会社ラークスエンタテインメント): A computer animation studio established in 2006-07.
Lerche (ラルケ): An animation brand established in 2011 by the studio. The majority of the projects from Studio Hibari have been made under this brand since the creation of it instead of using the Studio Hibari brand, which have been used more for other venues like production in anime.

Works

Television series
Sensual Phrase (1999−2000)
Taro the Space Alien (2000−2001)
Tantei Shounen Kageman (2001−2002)
 Duel Masters Charge (2004–2006)
 Duel Masters: Sacred Lands (with Hasbro Studios, 2005–2006)
Mirmo! (2002−2005)
Happy Lesson (2002)
Raimuiro Senkitan (2003)
Happy Lesson Advance (2003)
Grandpa Danger (2004−2005)
Major (episodes 1−78, 2004−2007)
Happy Seven (with Trinet Entertainment, 2005)
Gargoyle of Yoshinaga House (with Trinet Entertainment, 2006)
Tsuyokiss (with Trinet Entertainment, 2006)
Nerima Daikon Brothers (2006)
Kashimashi: Girl Meets Girl (2006)
Sumomomo Momomo (2006–2007)
Venus Versus Virus (2007)
Moonlight Mile (2007)
Net Ghost PiPoPa (2008−2009)
Charger Girl Ju-den Chan (2009)
Weiß Survive (2009)
Weiß Survive R (2009–2010)
Yumeiro Patissiere (produced by Studio Pierrot, 2009)
Yumeiro Patissiere SP Professional (produced by Studio Pierrot, 2010)
Clean Freak! Aoyama-kun (2017)
High Card (2023)

OVA/ONAs
Izumo (with Grouper Productions and Corp, 1991)
Raimuiro Senkitan: The South Island Dream Romantic Adventure (2004)
Netrun-mon The Movie 1: Net no Sumi de Blog to Sakebu (2004)
Kashimashi: Girl Meets Girl (2006)
Sumomomo Momomo (2007)
Ketai Shoujo (2007)
Hoshi no Umi no Amuri (2008)
Isshoni Training: Training with Hinako (2009)
Isshoni Sleeping: Sleeping with Hinako (2010)
Isshoni Training 026: Bathtime with Hinako & Hiyoko (2010)
Yumeiro Patissiere: Mune Kyun Tropical Island! (2010)
Land of the Lustrous (2013)
Monster Strike (2015−2016, production co-operation by Ultra Super Pictures)
Monster Strike: Mermaid Rhapsody (2016, production co-operation by Ultra Super Pictures)
Monster Strike: An Encore of Continuance- Pandora's Box (2016, production co-operation by Ultra Super Pictures)
Ninjala (2020, production co-operation by Domerica)
Tekken: Bloodline (with Larx Entertainment, 2022)

Films
Duel Masters: Curse of the Deathphoenix (2005)
Junod (2010)
The Stranger by the Shore (2020)

Video games
Dragon Master Silk (1997)
Gotcha Force (2003)
Persona 4 (2008) Contributed Cutscenes with A-1 Pictures Inc.
Shining Force Feather (2009)
Disgaea D2: A Brighter Darkness (2013)

Notes

References

External links
Studio Hibari official website 
Larx Entertainment official website 
Lerche official website 

 
Japanese animation studios
Mass media companies established in 1979
Japanese companies established in 1979
Nerima